Boise Creek is a stream in Humboldt County, California, United States. From its origin on Orleans Mountain it flows 8.5 miles to join the Klamath River about 2.25 miles southeast of Orleans, California. The creek lies within the Six Rivers National Forest and is part of the Lower Klamath River Watershed.

Coho salmon (Oncorhynchus kisutch) populations have declined dramatically in the Klamath River watershed due to eutrophication, raised water temperatures and decreased stream flows induced by the construction of dams, especially in years of drought. In addition, the dams have blocked access for salmon spawning grounds on over 300 miles of Klamath River watershed. The Coho salmon in the Southern Oregon - Northern California Coast (SONCC) Evolutionarily Significant Unit (ESU) are federally listed as threatened and are also listed as threatened by the California Department of Fish and Game since 2002.

 
Access to Boise Creek for salmon has been blocked by a bedrock falls 13.5 feet high near the creekmouth (see figure) so the Mid Klamath Watershed Council proposed, in February 2010, creation of an engineered logjam to divert flows into historic side channels which would re-connect the creek to the Klamath River mainstem and bypass the falls. Before the logjam could be constructed, beaver coincidentally constructed a dam across Boise Creek at the proposed site, and numerous Coho salmon, Chinook salmon (Oncorhynchus tshawytscha) and Steelhead trout (Oncorhyncus mykiss) are now accessing the stream from the Klamath, opening several new miles of historic spawning habitat to the fish.

The beaver dam has also created off-channel ponds which have been shown to benefit coho by providing refuge from high flow conditions in the main river and a productive summer rearing habitat, leading to as much as a five-fold increase in coho abundance as well as increased size. It has also been shown that off-channel wetlands enhance chinook salmon growth and survival.

See also
 Course of the Klamath River

References

External links
 

Rivers of Humboldt County, California
Tributaries of the Klamath River
Rivers of Northern California